The Roman Catholic Archdiocese of Pouso Alegre is an archdiocese located in the city of Pouso Alegre in Brazil.

History
On 4 August 1900, Pope Leo XIII established the Diocese of Pouso Alegre from the Diocese of Mariana.  Blessed John XXIII elevated the diocese to the a Metropolitan Archdiocese on 14 April 1962.

Special churches
Minor Basilicas:
Basilica de Nossa Senhora do Carmo, Borda da Mata, Minas Gerais

Bishops

Ordinaries, in reverse chronological order
 Archbishops of Pouso Alegre (Roman rite), below
 Archbishop José Luiz Majella Delgado (2014.05.28 – present)
 Archbishop Ricardo Pedro Chaves Pinto Filho, O. Praem. (1996.10.16 – 2014.05.28)
 Archbishop João Bergese (1991.05.05 – 1996.03.21)
 Archbishop José d’Angelo Neto (1962.04.14 – 1990.05.31), below
 Bishops of Pouso Alegre (Roman Rite) 
 Bishop José d’Angelo Neto (later Archbishop) (1960.03.12 – 1962.04.14)
 Bishop Octávio Augusto Chagas de Miranda (1916.02.14 – 1959.10.29)
 Bishop Antônio Augusto de Assis (1909.11.29 – 1916.02.07), appointed Bishop of Guaxupé, Minas Gerais; future Archbishop 
 Bishop João Batista Corrêa Nery (1901.05.18 – 1908.08.03), appointed Bishop of Campinas

Coadjutor bishop
Oscar de Oliveira (1954-1959), did not succeed to see; appointed Coadjutor Archbishop of Mariana, Minas Gerais

Auxiliary bishops
Antônio Augusto de Assis (1907-1909), appointed Bishop here
João Bosco Oliver de Faria (1987-1992), appointed Bishop of Patos de Minas, Minas Gerais
José Francisco Rezende Dias (2001-2005), appointed Bishop of Duque de Caxias, Rio de Janeiro

Other priests of this diocese who became bishops
Antônio Carlos Félix, appointed Bishop of Luz, Minas Gerais in 2003
Marco Aurélio Gubiotti, appointed Bishop of Itabira-Fabriciano, Minas Gerais in 2013
Edson José Oriolo dos Santos, appointed Auxiliary Bishop of Belo Horizonte, Minas Gerais in 2015

Suffragan dioceses
 Diocese of Campanha 
 Diocese of Guaxupé

Sources

Roman Catholic dioceses in Brazil
Roman Catholic ecclesiastical provinces in Brazil
 
Christian organizations established in 1900
Roman Catholic dioceses and prelatures established in the 19th century